Karlie Denise Hay (born December 12, 1997) is an American model and beauty pageant titleholder who was crowned Miss Teen USA 2016. She is the first Texan to win the crown since  2011.

Early life
Hay was born on December 12, 1997, in Tomball, Texas. As a child, some of her family members dealt with alcoholism and substance abuse. She graduated from Tomball High School in 2016, where she was a cheerleader. Prior to winning Miss Teen USA, Hay was planning on attending Texas A&M University to study business.

Pageantry

Miss Texas Teen USA 2016
Hay represented Kemah in the Miss Texas Teen USA 2016 pageant. On November 29, 2015, she was crowned the winner by outgoing titleholder Chloe Kembel, beating out first runner-up Thekla McCarthy of La Grange.

Miss Teen USA 2016
On July 30, 2016, Hay was crowned Miss Teen USA 2016 by outgoing titleholder Katherine Haik. She beat out first runner-up Emily Wakeman of North Carolina.

Controversy
Almost immediately following Hay's crowning as Miss Teen USA 2016, screenshots of her Twitter account dating from 2013 and 2014 were released with Hay repeatedly using the words "nigga" and "nigger". This sparked outrage amongst fans, who accused Hay of racism. Miss Teen USA 2010 Kamie Crawford condemned Hay for not cleaning up her Twitter account prior to becoming a public figure. Hay went on to apologize on her Twitter account for what she calls language that she's "not proud of and that there is no excuse for."

References

Living people
1997 births
Miss Teen USA winners
People from Tomball, Texas
American beauty pageant winners
Female models from Texas
Beauty pageant controversies
21st-century American women